Reiner Salzer (born February 12, 1942 in Aue (Sachsen)) is a German chemist (Analytical Chemistry) and university teacher of Analytical Chemistry at the TU Dresden.

Salzer studied chemistry from 1962 in Leipzig with a diploma in 1967. After his doctorate with Gerhard Geiseler 1971 on the intensity of infrared spectral bands he was a post-doc at the University of Ljubljana with Dušan Hadži (born 1921). Salzer habilitated in 1979 in Leipzig (Specific interactions and conformations in alkane derivatives). In 1990 he was appointed Full Professor of Analytical Chemistry at TU Dresden and Head of the Institute of Analytical Chemistry from 1991 – 2007.

Salzer employed various spectroscopic techniques (IR, Raman) for his investigations. His main research interests include molecular monitoring for early detection of diseases as well as analytical applications of biological active polymers such as artificial or natural ion channels.

1990/91 he was appointed Visiting Professor at the University of Oslo, later on he moved for research stays to Canada and to the USA. 2009 he was appointed Visiting Professor at the Gadjah Mada University of Yogyakarta, Indonesia.

Salzer is a member of the Norwegian Academy of Science in Oslo.

Academic Offices and Positions (selection) 
 1990 – 1998 — Board Member of the German Working Group of Applied Spectroscopy (DASp)
 1996 – 2003 — Vice-Chairman and Chairman of the Division Analytical Chemistry of the German Chemical Society (GDCh)
 since 1997 — German Delegate to the Division Analytical Chemistry (DAC) of the European Association for Chemical and Molecular Sciences (EuCheMS)
 1997 – 2001 — Member of the GDCh Commission for Reforms in Chemistry Curricula
 1999 – 2007 — Member in Evaluation Committees of the German Council of Science and Humanities
 2000 – 2007 — Member of the Review Board Natural Sciences of the German Research Council (DFG) 
 2002 – 2009 — Member / Chairman of the Selection Committee of the Fresenius Prize of the GDCh
 2002 – 2010 — Member of the "Bologna Commission" of the GDCh
 since 2003 — Head of the Study Group Education of DAC/EuCheMS
 since 2006 — Member/Vice-Chair/Chair of the ECTN Label Committee for the labels Chemistry Eurobachelor®, Chemistry Euromaster® and Chemistry Doctorate Eurolabel®
 since 2008 — Member / Head of the Jury of the Robert Kellner Lecture of DAC/EuCheMS
 since 2010 — Column Editor of "ABCs of Education and Professional Development in Analytical Science" of the journal Analytical and Bioanalytical Chemistry
 since 2010 — Series Editor of "Lecture Notes in Chemistry" of Springer

Awards 
 2007 — Emich Plaque of the Austrian Society of Analytical Chemistry
 2011 — Clemens Winkler Medal of the German Chemical Society
 2012 — Hanuš Medal of the Czech Chemical Society
 2013 — Ioannes Marcus Marci Medal of the Czech Spectroscopic Society Ioannes Marcus Marci
 2015 — Tribute of the Division Analytical Chemistry of the European Association for Chemical and Molecular Sciences

Publications (selection)

External links 
 TU Dresden
 Chemistry Quality Eurolabels

References 

1942 births
Living people
21st-century German chemists
20th-century German chemists
People from Erzgebirgskreis